Harry E. Stephens (November 2, 1857 – November 28, 1939) was a member of the Wisconsin State Assembly.

Stephens was born in Lafayette County, Wisconsin. He served in the Assembly during the 1927, 1929 and 1931 sessions. In addition, he was mayor of Platteville, Wisconsin and a partner in the Blockhouse Mining company. He was a Republican.

References

People from Lafayette County, Wisconsin
People from Platteville, Wisconsin
Mayors of places in Wisconsin
Republican Party members of the Wisconsin State Assembly
1857 births
1939 deaths